Bwiam, or Bwiam-Kankuntu, is a small town in southwestern Gambia. It is located in Foni Kansala District in the Western Division. As of 2009, it has an estimated population of 3,834.

Notable people
Sainey Nyassi (born 31 January 1989) - Footballer
Sanna Nyassi (born 31 January 1989) - Footballer
Tijan Jaiteh (born 31 December 1988) - Footballer
Sulayman Badjie (born 8 August 1969) - Former Commander of the Republican National Guard under Yahya Jammeh.

Culture and Sights 
Near catholic Fatima secondary school is a local sight called Bwiam cooking pot, a big cast iron pot, believed to have been here for more than a hundred years.
Between Bwiam und Bondali is a holy / sacred tree as place of worship known under the name of Kanjendi.

References

Populated places in the Gambia